The Székelys (Székely runes: 𐳥𐳋𐳓𐳉𐳗),  also referred to as Szeklers, are a Hungarian subgroup living mostly in the Székely Land in Romania. In addition to their native villages in Suceava County in Bukovina, a significant population descending from the Székelys of Bukovina currently lives in Tolna and Baranya counties in Hungary and certain districts of Vojvodina, Serbia.

In the Middle Ages, the Székelys played a role in the defense of the Kingdom of Hungary against the Ottomans in their posture as guards of the eastern border. With the Treaty of Trianon of 1920, Transylvania (including the Székely Land) became part of Romania, and the Székely population was a target of Romanianization efforts. In 1952, during the communist rule of Romania, the former counties with the highest concentration of Székely population – Mureș, Odorhei, Ciuc, and Trei Scaune – were legally designated as the Magyar Autonomous Region. It was superseded in 1960 by the Mureș-Magyar Autonomous Region, itself divided in 1968 into two non-autonomous counties, Harghita and Mureș. In post-Cold War Romania, where the Székelys form roughly half of the ethnic Hungarian population, members of the group have been among the most vocal of Hungarians seeking an autonomous Székely region in Transylvania. They were estimated to number about 860,000 in the 1970s and are officially recognized as a distinct minority group by the Romanian government.

Today's Székely Land roughly corresponds to the Romanian counties of Harghita, Covasna, and central and eastern Mureș where they currently make up roughly 80% of the population. Based on the official 2011 Romanian census, 1,227,623 ethnic Hungarians live in Romania, mostly in the region of Transylvania, making up 19.6% of the population of this region. Of these, 609,033 live in the counties of Harghita, Covasna, and Mureș, which taken together have a Hungarian majority (58%). The Hungarians in Székely Land, therefore, account for half (49.41%) of the Hungarians in Romania. When given the choice on the 2011 Romanian census between ethnically identifying as Székely or as Hungarian, the overwhelming majority of the Székelys chose the latter – only 532 persons declared themselves as ethnic Székely.

History
 

The Székely territories came under the leadership of the Count of the Székelys (Latin: Comes Siculorum), initially a royal appointee from the non-Székely Hungarian nobility who was de facto a margrave; from the 15th century onward, the voivodes of Transylvania held the office themselves. The Székelys were considered a distinct ethnic group (natio Siculica) and formed part of the Unio Trium Nationum ("Union of Three Nations"), a coalition of three Transylvanian estates, the other two "nations" being the (also predominantly Hungarian) nobility and the Saxons (that is, ethnic German burghers). These three groups ruled Transylvania from 1438 onward, usually in harmony though sometimes in conflict with one another. During the Long Turkish War, the Székelys formed an alliance with Prince Michael the Brave of Wallachia against the army of Andrew Báthory, recently appointed Prince of Transylvania.

Origins

The origin of the Székelys has been much debated. It is now generally accepted that they are descendants of Hungarians. The Székelys have historically claimed descent from Attila's Huns and believed they played a special role in shaping Hungary. Ancient legends recount that a contingent of Huns remained in Transylvania, later allying with the main Hungarian army that conquered the Carpathian Basin in the 9th century. The thirteenth-century chronicler Simon of Kéza also claimed that the Székely people descended from Huns who lived in mountainous lands prior to the Hungarian conquest.

After the theory of Hunnic descent lost scholarly currency in the 20th century, two substantial ideas emerged about Székely ancestry:
 Some scholars suggested that the Székelys were simply Magyars, like other Hungarians, transplanted in the Middle Ages to guard the frontiers. Researchers could not prove that Székelys spoke a different language. In this case, their strong cultural differences from other Hungarians stem from centuries of relative isolation in the mountains.
 Others suggested Turkic origin as Avar, Kabar or Esegel-Bulgar ancestries.

Some historians have dated the Székely presence in the Eastern Carpathian Mountains as early as the fifth century, and found historical evidence that the Székelys were part of the Avar confederation during the so-called Dark Ages, but this does not mean that they were ethnically Avar.

Research indicates that Székelys spoke Hungarian. Toponyms at the Székely settlement area also give proof of their Hungarian mother tongue. The Székely dialect does not have more Bulgaro-Turkish loan-words derived from before the Hungarian conquest of the Carpathian Basin than standard Hungarian does. Even if the Székelys had been a Turkic stock they had to have lost their original vernacular at a very early date.

Genetics
An autosomal analysis, studying non-European admixture in Europeans, found 4.4% of admixture of East Asian/Central Asian among Hungarians, which was the strongest among sampled populations. It was found at 3.6% in Belarusians, 2.5% in Romanians, 2.3% in Bulgarians and Lithuanians, 1.9% in Poles and 0% in Greeks. The authors stated "This signal might correspond to a small genetic legacy from invasions of peoples from the Asian steppes (e.g., the Huns, Magyars, and Bulgars) during the first millennium CE."

Among 100 Hungarian men (90 of them from the Great Hungarian Plain), the following haplogroups and frequencies are obtained:

The 97 Székelys belong to the following haplogroups:

It can be inferred that Szekelys have more significant German admixture. A study sampling 45 Palóc from Budapest and northern Hungary, found

A study estimating possible Inner Asian admixture among nearly 500 Hungarians based on paternal lineages only, estimated it at 5.1% in Hungary, at 7.4% in Székelys and at 6.3% at Csangos. It has boldly been noted that this is an upper limit by deep SNPs and that the main haplogroups responsible for that contribution are J2-M172 (negative M47, M67, L24, M12), J2-L24, R1a-Z93, Q-M242 and E-M78, the last of which is typically European, while N is still negligible (1.7%). In an attempt to divide N into subgroups L1034 and L708, some Hungarian, Sekler, and Uzbek samples were found to be L1034 SNP positive, while all Mongolians, Buryats, Khanty, Finnish, and Roma samples showed a negative result for this marker. The 2500 years old SNP L1034 was found typical for Mansi and Hungarians, the closest linguistic relatives.

Demographics
The Székely live mainly in Harghita, Covasna and Mureș counties. They identify themselves as Hungarians, but they maintain a somewhat distinct ethnic identity from other Hungarians. Hungarians form a majority of the population in the counties of Covasna and Harghita. They were estimated to number about 860,000 in the 1970s and are officially recognized as a distinct minority group by the Romanian government.

The Székelys of Bukovina, today settled mostly in Vojvodina and southern Hungary, form a culturally separate group with its own history.

Autonomy

An autonomous Székely region existed between 1952 and 1968. First created as the Magyar Autonomous Region in 1952, it was renamed the Mureș-Magyar Autonomous Region in 1960. Ever since the abolition of the Mureș-Magyar Autonomous Region by the Ceaușescu regime in 1968, some of the Székely have pressed for their autonomy to be restored. Several proposals have been discussed within the Székely Hungarian community and by the Romanian majority. One of the Székely autonomy initiatives is based on the model of the Spanish autonomous community of Catalonia. A major peaceful demonstration was held in 2006 in favor of autonomy.

In 2013 and 2014, thousands of ethnic Hungarians marched for autonomy on 10 March (on the Székely Freedom Day) in Târgu Mureș, Romania. 10 March is the anniversary of the execution in Târgu Mureș in 1854, by the Austrian authorities, of three Székelys who tried to achieve national self-determination. Since 2015, the Székelys also have the Székely Autonomy Day, celebrated every last Sunday of October.

Literature

Áron Tamási, a 20th-century Székely writer from Lupeni, Harghita, wrote many novels about the Székely which set universal stories of love and self-individuation against the backdrop of Székely village culture. Other Székely writers include the folklorist Elek Benedek, the novelist József Nyírő and the poet Sándor Kányádi.

Symbols

The flag and coat of arms of the Székelys as approved by the Szekler National Council, one of the main political organizations of the Székelys.

The Sun and Moon are the symbols of the Székelys, and are used in the coat of arms of Transylvania and on the Romanian national coat of arms. The Sun and the Moon, the symbols of the cosmic world, are known from Hungarian grave findings from the period of the Hungarian conquest. After the Hungarians became Christians in the 11th century, the importance of these icons became purely visual and symbolic. The Székelys have succeeded in preserving traditions to an extent unusual even in Central and Eastern Europe. A description of the Székely Land and its traditions was written between 1859 and 1868 by Balázs Orbán in his Description of the Székely Land.

Image gallery

See also
History of the Székely people
Székely Land
List of Székelys
List of Székely settlements
Szekler National Council
Count of the Székelys
Székelys of Bukovina
Ugron de Ábránfalva

Notes

References

Further reading
 Makkai, László (2001). "Transylvania in the medieval Hungarian kingdom (896–1526)", In: Béla Köpeczi, History of Transylvania Volume I. From the Beginnings to 1606, Columbia University Press, New York, 2001,

External links

 "Minority Cultures: The Szeklers Tortured History"
 Ioan Aurel Pop, "The Ethno-Confessional Structure of Medieval Transylvania and Hungary". Cluj Napoca, 1994 (Bulletin of the Center for Transylvanian Studies, vol. III, number 4, July 1994)

Hungarian:
 Székely history until 1848
https://m.nyest.hu/media/a-szekely-minta-genetikai-tavolsaga-a-tobbi-etnikai-csoporttol-es-mas-neessegektol.jpg?large
http://www2.sci.u-szeged.hu/fokozatok/PDF/Kovacsne_Csanyi_Bernadett/PhDertekezes_CsanyiB.pdf

Hungarian minorities in Europe
Ethnic groups in Romania